Women's doubles were played at the 2019 Dubai Tennis Championships at the Aviation Club Tennis Centre in Dubai, United Arab Emirates. The women's tournament took place from 17 to 23 February. Chan Hao-ching and Yang Zhaoxuan were the defending champions, but chose to participate with different partners. Chan played alongside her sister Latisha, but they lost in the semifinals to Hsieh Su-wei and Barbora Strýcová. Yang partnered Abigail Spears, but lost in the first round to Eugenie Bouchard and Sofia Kenin.

Hsieh and Strýcová went on to win the title, defeating Lucie Hradecká and Ekaterina Makarova in the final, 6–4, 6–4.

Seeds
The top four seeds and the seventh seeds received a bye into the second round (the latter as the result of a late withdrawal).

Draw

Finals

Top half

Bottom half

References

External links
Main Draw

Women's Doubles
2019 WTA Tour